The 1978–79 Chicago Black Hawks season was the 53rd season of operation of the Chicago Black Hawks in the National Hockey League.  The club was coming off a first-place finish in the Smythe Division in 1977-78.  In the 1978 Stanley Cup playoffs, the Black Hawks were swept by the Boston Bruins in four games in the quarter-finals.

Offseason
The Black Hawks had a very quiet off-season, however, Chicago did acquire goaltender 21-year-old goaltender Murray Bannerman from the Vancouver Canucks to complete an earlier trade that sent Pit Martin to the Canucks.  Bannerman spent the previous season with the Fort Wayne Komets of the IHL, and did appear in a game with Vancouver, allowing no goals in a period of action.

In a couple of minor trades, Chicago traded away Pierre Plante to the Minnesota North Stars to complete an earlier deal, and in a separate trade, Chicago traded Thomas Gradin to the Vancouver Canucks for the Canucks second round draft pick in the 1980 NHL Entry Draft.

Regular season
Chicago opened the season with a six-game unbeaten streak, going 3-0-3, before suffering their first loss.  The Hawks would struggle after their hot start, as Chicago saw their record fall to 17-24-9 at the start of February, however, despite their poor record, the Black Hawks were in first place in the Smythe Division.  The Black Hawks turned their fortunes around in their next 14 games, going 8-3-3, putting their record at 25-27-12, with 62 points, 14 ahead of the second place Vancouver Canucks.  Chicago then fell into an eight-game winless streak (0-7-1), but still held a 10-point lead.  Chicago then finished the season with a 29-36-15 record, earning 73 points, and winning the Smythe Division for the second season in a row, and seventh division title in the past ten seasons.

Offensively, the Black Hawks were led by Ivan Boldirev, who led the club with 29 goals and 64 points in 66 games.  Stan Mikita had 19 goals and a team high 36 assists for 55 points to finish second in team scoring.  Defenceman Bob Murray scored 19 goals and 51 points to lead the Black Hawks blueline.  Defenceman Dave Logan had a team high 175 penalty minutes, while winger Ted Bulley led Chicago with a +18 rating.

In goal, Tony Esposito saw the majority of playing time, going 24-28-11 with a 3.27 GAA, while earning four shutouts.

Final standings

Game log

Playoffs
Since the Hawks won their division, they were given a bye in the NHL Preliminary Round, and advanced straight to the NHL quarter-finals.  Their first round opponent was the New York Islanders, who finished with the best record in the NHL, going 51-15-14, earning 116 points and winning the Patrick Division.  The series opened with two games at Nassau Veterans Memorial Coliseum on Long Island, New York, with the Islanders, led by a Mike Bossy hat trick, easily defeated Chicago 6-2.  The second game was decided in overtime, after the two teams played through three scoreless periods.  The Islanders Mike Bossy scored his fourth goal of the series in overtime to give New York the 1-0 victory, and a 2-0 series lead.  Black Hawks goaltender Tony Esposito made 39 saves in the loss, while Islanders goaltender Billy Smith stopped all 22 shots he faced.  The series moved to Chicago Stadium for the next two games.  In the third game, the Islanders once again shutout the Black Hawks, this time with goaltender Chico Resch making 21 saves for the shutout, as New York defeated the Hawks 4-0 to take a 3-0 series lead.  The Islanders would complete the sweep in the fourth game, winning 3-1, and sending the Blackhawks to their sixteenth consecutive playoff loss.

New York Islanders 4, Chicago Black Hawks 0

Player stats

Regular season
Scoring

Goaltending

Playoffs
Scoring

Goaltending

Note: Pos = Position; GP = Games played; G = Goals; A = Assists; Pts = Points; +/- = plus/minus; PIM = Penalty minutes; PPG = Power-play goals; SHG = Short-handed goals; GWG = Game-winning goals
      MIN = Minutes played; W = Wins; L = Losses; T = Ties; GA = Goals-against; GAA = Goals-against average; SO = Shutouts;

Awards and records

Transactions

Draft picks
Chicago's draft picks at the 1978 NHL Amateur Draft held at the Queen Elizabeth Hotel in Montreal, Quebec.

Farm teams

See also
1978–79 NHL season

References

External links
 

Chicago Blackhawks seasons
Chicago Blackhawks
Chicago Blackhawks
Smythe Division champion seasons